John Jaenike is an ecologist and evolutionary biologist, and currently a professor at the University of Rochester New York. Jaenike was an early proponent of the Red Queen Hypothesis, using the idea to explain the maintenance of sex. Jaenike is also known for his extensive work on mushroom-feeding Drosophila and the evolution of their inherited bacterial symbionts Wolbachia and Spiroplasma poulsonii.

In 2015, the trypanosomatid parasite Jaenimonas drosophilae was named in Jaenike's honour.

See also 
 Drosophila quinaria species group
 Mushroom-feeding Drosophila

References 

Living people
American ecologists
Evolutionary biologists
1949 births
Princeton University alumni